The tritium breeding blanket (also known as a fusion blanket, lithium blanket or simply blanket), is a key part of many proposed fusion reactor designs. It serves several purposes; one is to act as a cooling mechanism, absorbing the energy from the neutrons produced within the plasma by the nuclear fusion reaction between deuterium and tritium (D-T), another is to "breed" further tritium fuel, that would otherwise be difficult to obtain in sufficient quantities, through the reaction of neutrons with lithium in the blanket.  The breeder blanket further serves as shielding, preventing the high-energy neutrons from escaping to the area outside the reactor and protecting the more radiation-susceptible portions, such as ohmic or superconducting magnets, from damage.

Of these three duties, it is only the breeding portion that cannot be replaced by other means. For instance, a large quantity of water makes an excellent cooling system and neutron shield, as in the case of a conventional nuclear reactor. However, tritium is difficult to obtain in sufficient quantity to run a reactor through other means, so if commercial fusion using the D-T cycle is to be achieved, successful breeding of the tritium in commercial quantities is a requirement.

Breeding blanket designs are mostly based on lithium containing ceramics, with a focus on lithium titanate and lithium orthosilicate. These materials, mostly in a pebble form, are used to produce and extract tritium and helium; must withstand high mechanical and thermal loads; and, should not become excessively radioactive upon completion of their useful service life.

To date, no large-scale breeding system has been attempted, and it is an open question whether such a system is possible to create.

ITER runs a major effort in blanket design and will test a number of potential solutions. Concepts for the breeder blanket include helium-cooled lithium lead (HCLL), helium-cooled pebble bed (HCPB), and water-cooled lithium lead (WCLL) methods. Six different tritium breeding systems, known as Test Blanket Modules (TBM) wil be tested in ITER.

References

External links
 
 

Nuclear fusion
Lithium